Andrei Arlovski (born 4 February 1979) is a Belarusian-American professional mixed martial artist, actor and former UFC Heavyweight Champion. He currently competes in the Heavyweight division for the Ultimate Fighting Championship  (UFC) and holds the record for most wins (23) in UFC heavyweight history. Arlovski has also competed for Strikeforce, WSOF, Affliction, EliteXC, ONE FC and M-1 Challenge.

Early life
Arlovski was born in Babruisk, Byelorussian SSR, Soviet Union (now Belarus). When he was younger, bullies often picked on him and beat him up. In 1994, when he was 14 years old, he had finally had enough and started lifting weights to put on muscle and, he hoped, to help him deal with these bullies. Arlovski only took up martial arts at the age of 16 in sports such as Sambo, Judo and Kickboxing.

Enrolling at the police academy in Minsk, Arlovski combined his interest in a career in law enforcement with his growing martial arts participation by taking up the required police defense course in Sambo  and quickly showed himself to be a highly competent Sambo opponent. In 1999, Arlovski won the European Youth Sambo Championship and the World Youth Championship. Not long after, Arlovski became the first Master of Sports and then International Master of Sports. He took a silver medal at the Sambo World Cup and another silver medal at the World Sambo Championship.

Arlovski began taking a greater interest in other martial arts, studying kickboxing and developing his striking skills to complement his Sambo-based grappling abilities.

Mixed martial arts career
At the age of 20, Arlovski began his professional MMA career at the Mix Fight M-1 in St Petersburg, Russia on 9 April 1999 facing Viacheslav Datsik. After a competitive stand up battle, Arlovski would be knocked out with a hard straight, losing his debut. Not deterred, Arlovski returned in 2000 to M-1 Global at the European Championships, taking the heavyweight crown with a submission victory and a KO victory.

Ultimate Fighting Championship
Arlovski made his Ultimate Fighting Championship debut at UFC 28, defeating Aaron Brink by submission. He was then thrown in against top opposition, losing to future UFC Heavyweight Champion Ricco Rodriguez at UFC 32 and heavyweight contender Pedro Rizzo at UFC 36. Despite those early defeats, wins over future British Cage Rage Light heavyweight Champion Ian Freeman at UFC 40 and future IFL Light heavyweight Champion Vladimir Matyushenko at UFC 44 propelled Arlovski back into the UFC elite.

In 2004, a motorcycle accident injury suffered by then UFC Heavyweight Champion Frank Mir led to the creation of an interim heavyweight title. It was decided that the two top heavyweight contenders would meet to declare the interim champion. Arlovski faced former heavyweight champion, Tim Sylvia. They were originally supposed to fight at UFC 47, but Sylvia was pulled from the fight due to recurring positive drug tests. Arlovski ended up facing Wesley Correira, winning the fight via TKO in the second round. The pairing of Arlovski and Sylvia remained intact and occurred at UFC 51. In the fight, Arlovski eventually connected with an overhand right and dropped Sylvia. On the ground, Arlovski followed up with an Achilles lock that forced Sylvia to tap out at 47 seconds of the first round, making Arlovski the new UFC Interim Heavyweight Champion.

Arlovski went on to defend his interim title on 4 June 2005, at UFC 53, against Justin Eilers. Arlovski won the bout by TKO in the first round. After the fight, it was revealed that Eilers had suffered extensive injuries, including a badly broken nose, two broken hands and a complete ACL tear.

In October 2005, Arlovski once again defended his title at UFC 55 against top contender Paul Buentello. Arlovski knocked out Buentello in 15 seconds of the opening round. On 12 August 2005, the UFC announced that it now recognized Arlovski as the undisputed heavyweight champion, as Frank Mir had not fully rehabilitated from his motorcycle accident.

In a rematch with Tim Sylvia at UFC 59 on 15 April 2006, Arlovski knocked Sylvia down with a right-hand punch early in the first round. Sylvia was able to protect himself and recovered almost immediately. While Arlovski tried to finish Sylvia with a right lead, Sylvia countered with a short right uppercut to the chin, knocking Arlovski to the mat. Sylvia followed up with punches on the ground until referee Herb Dean stopped the match at 2:43 of the first round.

The rubber match between Tim Sylvia and Arlovski took place on 8 July 2006, at UFC 61. In what turned out to be a 5-round battle of attrition, neither fighter was able to KO the other, or even land any truly significant blows. In the end, Sylvia won the fight by unanimous decision. It was later discovered that during the fight, Arlovski had been significantly injured by a checked leg kick sometime in the second round which left him unable to throw kicks of his own or make any takedown attempts. When confronted by a reporter about the injury, Arlovski avoided responding directly and would only say "I do not want to talk about my injuries or look for any other excuses." Not too long after it was revealed Sylvia had sustained an injury as he fainted at his hotel room and upon hospital examination, doctors discovered a concussion.

Arlovski made his next appearance on 30 December 2006, at UFC 66 against Brazilian Jiu-Jitsu black belt Márcio Cruz. After being taken down, he kicked Cruz in the shoulder (which is legal), but it was mistaken for a head kick (which is illegal) by referee Herb Dean. When the referee intervened, he decided, because of Cruz's insistence, to allow both fighters to stay on the ground as opposed to standing them up, as is the general practice. Thereafter, Arlovski struck Cruz with a strong blow to the chin, then continued beating Cruz with hammer fists until the fight was stopped.

Arlovski fought PRIDE veteran and two-time world Brazilian Jiu-Jitsu champion Fabrício Werdum at UFC 70, winning by unanimous decision. Both fighters kept their distance for the majority of the fight, causing the referee to inform them at the beginning of the third round that he would remove a point from the first fighter to retreat in that round. Although Arlovski won the fight by unanimous decision, many boos could be heard from the crowd. After the fight, Arlovski apologized to the fans for not fighting for the full fifteen minutes.

After 11 months of inactivity, Arlovski made his return to the octagon at UFC 82 and defeated Jake O'Brien by TKO in round two. It was O'Brien's first MMA loss and Arlovski's final fight on his UFC contract.

Affliction Entertainment
After leaving the UFC, Arlovski signed with the newly created MMA-promotion Affliction and participated in their inaugural event Affliction: Banned on 19 July 2008. He fought and defeated top-ranked heavyweight fighter and former IFL heavyweight stand-out Ben Rothwell by KO in the final round of the fight, ending Rothwell's 13 fight win streak and giving him his first defeat in over 3 years.

Originally scheduled to face former UFC Heavyweight Champion and top-ranked heavyweight Josh Barnett in the main event at Affliction's second pay-per-view, Affliction: Day of Reckoning, on 11 October 2008, the event was rescheduled and Arlovski would instead be matched up against the last reigning IFL Heavyweight Champion Roy Nelson at EliteXC: Heat on 4 October 2008, in Sunrise, Florida in a co-promotion with EliteXC. Arlovski won the fight via KO in the second round and in the process became the only man to ever finish Nelson in his MMA career at that point.

In January 2009, Arlovski faced the last reigning PRIDE heavyweight champion Fedor Emelianenko at Affliction: Day of Reckoning. Arlovski lost the fight via KO in the first round.

Strikeforce
On 6 June 2009, Arlovski fought up and coming heavyweight Brett Rogers at Strikeforce: Lawler vs. Shields. Arlovski lost the fight via TKO in the opening round. After the defeat, in October 2009, Arlovski began training with acclaimed MMA coach Greg Jackson. Arlovski was a featured attendee at Strikeforce: Emelianenko vs. Rogers, where he was mobbed by a crowd of local Chicago fans. Arlovski was signed to Strikeforce and fought former EliteXC heavyweight champion Antônio Silva on 15 May 2010, at Strikeforce: Heavy Artillery. Following 3 rounds of hard-hitting punches from both and with neither fighter giving in to the other, Arlovski lost by unanimous decision.

Arlovski was defeated by Sergei Kharitonov via KO on 12 February 2011, as part of the Strikeforce Heavyweight Grand Prix Tournament. It was his fourth straight loss, three of which were by way of KO. On 17 February 2011, Arlovski posted a video on his website in which he spoke for over an hour, repeatedly saying that he would absolutely not retire. Arlovski indicated that his trainers had recommended that he retire; however, Greg Jackson was against his retirement. Arlovski dedicated himself to training exclusively with Greg Jackson in New Mexico to refocus on his MMA career and make the necessary changes to get back on track.

ProElite
After several months of grueling training schedule in New Mexico with Greg Jackson and the likes of Jon Jones, Shane Carwin, and Travis Browne, Arlovski headlined ProElite 1 on 27 August at the Neal S. Blaisdell Center in Honolulu, Hawaii against heavyweight Ray Lopez. Arlovski won by TKO in the third round after dominating Lopez throughout the fight.

Arlovski faced off against veteran of over 300 fights Travis Fulton at ProElite 2 in November, serving as the co-main event. Arlovski won the fight via head kick KO in the final second of the third round. It was a knockout that caused Fulton, who had never been knocked out, to regain consciousness about 5 minutes after the fight was stopped. Fulton later admitted to Arlovski in the locker room that he has never been hit that hard in all of his 300 bouts.

ONE Fighting Championship
In mid-July 2012, it was announced that Arlovski had signed with the Asia-based promotion ONE Fighting Championship.  Originally Arlvoski was scheduled to fight Soa Palelei but Soa Palelei was later replaced with Tim Sylvia. The promotion quickly announced that Arlovski would face Tim Sylvia in his debut, marking the fourth time the two fighters had faced each other.

Arlovski and Sylvia faced off at ONE Fighting Championship: Pride of a Nation on 31 August 2012, in Manila. The fight between Arlovski and Tim Sylvia ended in a no-contest due to an illegal soccer kick by Arlovski. According to ONE FC rules, soccer kicks are legal only if the referee clears the fighter to do so after determining the grounded fighter can still intelligently defend himself. Arlovski received no such clearance and the kick was therefore deemed illegal. Four days later, One FC eliminated this restriction. This rule change, had it been enforced prior to the bout, would have resulted in Arlovski winning by TKO. Arlovski had knocked Tim Sylvia down with punches before he landed the illegal kicks that caused the referee to stop the fight.

World Series of Fighting
Arlovski headlined the debut event from the World Series of Fighting against fellow Strikeforce veteran Devin Cole on 3 November 2012, at World Series of Fighting 1 in Las Vegas, Nevada. This event aired live on NBC Sports. He won the fight via TKO in the first round.

Arlovski fought Anthony Johnson in the main event at World Series of Fighting 2 on 23 March 2013. He lost the fight via unanimous decision. Controversy arose after the fight when it was revealed that multiple rounds exceeded the five-minute time limit. The punch believed to have broken Arlovski's jaw was landed after the time at which the round should have ended.

Arlovski next replaced an injured Anthony Johnson against Mike Kyle at WSOF 5 on 14 September 2013. He won the fight via unanimous decision.

Independent promotions
Arlovski faced Bellator veteran Mike Hayes at Fight Nights: Battle of Moscow 9 on 16 December 2012, in Moscow, Russia. He won the fight via unanimous decision.

Arlovski was also scheduled to fight two-time ADCC Submission Wrestling World Champion and veteran of over 60 fights Jeff Monson in Rio de Janeiro, Brazil on 2 February 2013, but the event was postponed.

Arlovski fought Andreas Kraniotakes at Fight Nights - Battle in Minsk on 29 November 2013, and Arlovski won the fight via TKO in the second round.

Return to UFC
On 24 April 2014, it was confirmed by multiple MMA media websites that Arlovski had been granted his release from WSOF to return to UFC. The former heavyweight champion fought Brendan Schaub at UFC 174 on 14 June 2014. Arlovski was victorious in his return to the UFC, defeating Schaub via split decision (28–29, 29–28, and 29–28).

It was announced that Arlovski would be facing Antônio Silva in a rematch on 13 September 2014, at UFC Fight Night 51. Despite being a heavy betting underdog, Arlovski won the fight via knockout in the first round, after landing two consecutive right hands that dropped Silva and subsequent hammer fists on the ground with Silva unable to defend himself.  This win also won Arlovski his first Performance of the Night bonus award.

Arlovski faced Travis Browne on 23 May 2015, at UFC 187.  Despite being a heavy underdog and being knocked down in the first round, Arlovski stunned Browne multiple times throughout the opening minutes, and eventually won the fight via TKO in the first round. Post-fight, Joe Rogan revealed in the commentary that Arlovski came close to withdrawing from the fight due to a calf injury in training.  The win also earned Arlovski his first Fight of the Night bonus award.

Arlovski faced Frank Mir on 5 September 2015, at UFC 191, winning by unanimous decision (29–28, 29–28, and 30–27) in a fight which many, including UFC president Dana White, thought Mir won. 12 of 15 media outlets, however, scored the bout in favor of Arlovski.

Arlovski returned to face Stipe Miocic on 2 January 2016, at UFC 195. He was defeated via TKO in the first round.

Arlovski faced Alistair Overeem on 8 May 2016, at UFC Fight Night 87. After a back and forth first round, Arlovski lost the fight via TKO in the second round.

Arlovski next faced Josh Barnett on 3 September 2016, at UFC Fight Night 93. He lost the fight via rear naked choke submission in the third round, resulting in his first submission loss in his professional MMA career. Both participants were awarded Fight of the Night for their performance.

Arlovski faced Francis Ngannou on 28 January 2017 at UFC on Fox 23. He lost the fight via TKO in the first round.

Arlovski faced Marcin Tybura on 17 June 2017 at UFC Fight Night 111. He lost the fight by unanimous decision (29–28, 28–27, and 29–27).

After five consecutive defeats, Arlovski relocated his training to American Top Team.

Arlovski faced Júnior Albini at UFC Fight Night: Poirier vs. Pettis on 11 November 2017 in Norfolk, Virginia. He won the fight via unanimous decision.

Arlovski faced Stefan Struve on 4 March 2018 at UFC 222. He won the fight by unanimous decision. In the fight, Arlovski landed a career-best 4 takedowns, more than his entire career total up to that time (3) combined.

Arlovski faced Tai Tuivasa at UFC 225 on 9 June 2018. He lost the fight via unanimous decision.

Arlovski faced Shamil Abdurakhimov on 15 September 2018 at UFC Fight Night 136. He lost the fight by unanimous decision.

Arlovski faced Walt Harris on 29 December 2018 at UFC 232. He lost the fight via split decision. The result was overturned to no contest after Harris tested positive for prohibited substance LGB4033, a selective androgen receptor modulator (SARM).

Arlovski faced Augusto Sakai on 27 April 2019 at UFC Fight Night: Jacaré vs. Hermansson. He lost the fight by a controversial split decision.

A rematch with Ben Rothwell took place on 20 July 2019 at UFC on ESPN 4. He won the fight via unanimous decision and set the all-time record for UFC heavyweight victories at 17.

His next fight was with Jairzinho Rozenstruik on 2 November 2019 at UFC 244. He lost the fight via knockout in round one.

Arlovski was scheduled to face Philipe Lins on 2 May 2020 at UFC Fight Night: Hermansson vs. Weidman. However, on April 9, Dana White, the president of UFC announced that this event was postponed due to the ongoing Coronavirus pandemic. and rescheduled to May 13, 2020, at UFC Fight Night: Smith vs. Teixeira. He won the fight via unanimous decision.

Arlovski was expected to face Tanner Boser on 4 October 2020 at UFC on ESPN: Holm vs. Aldana. However a sickness with Arlovski delayed the bout four weeks later to UFC on ESPN: Santos vs. Teixeira. Arlovski won the fight via unanimous decision.

Arlovski faced Tom Aspinall on 20 February 2021 at UFC Fight Night 185. He lost the fight via a rear naked choke submission in round two.

Arlovski faced Chase Sherman, replacing Parker Porter, on 17 April 2021 at UFC on ESPN 22. He won the fight via unanimous decision.

Arlovski faced Carlos Felipe on 16 October 2021 at UFC Fight Night 195. He won the fight via unanimous decision.

Arlovski faced Jared Vanderaa on February 12, 2022, at UFC 271. He won the fight via split decision. 18 out of 18 media outlets scored the fight in favor of Arlovski.

Arlovski faced Jake Collier, replacing Justin Tafa, on April 30, 2022, at UFC on ESPN 35. He won the fight via split decision. 14 out of 14 media scores gave it to Collier.

Arlovski faced Marcos Rogério de Lima on October 29, 2022, at UFC Fight Night 213. He lost the fight via rear-naked choke in round one.

Personal life
Arlovski resides in Chicago with his wife, son, and their pit bull terrier Maximus. He is an Orthodox Christian. Arlovski did a public service announcement against dog fighting featuring Maximus and calling it inhumane and torture. Arlovski said he chose his nickname The Pitbull for the positive qualities these dogs have.

Movie and television career
Arlovski's movie debut was in 8 of Diamonds in 2006. He starred in Universal Soldier: Regeneration in 2009, along with Jean-Claude Van Damme and Dolph Lundgren. In the movie, he plays an "NGU", a new generation UniSol in the main "bad guy" role. The movie was released directly to video on 2 February 2010, in the United States. Arlovski also played a part in the next Universal Soldier movie — Universal Soldier: Day of Reckoning, released in theaters on 30 November 2012, and on demand on 25 October 2012.

In 2015, Arlovski appeared on the TV show Limitless in episode 7 "Brian Finch's Black Op". Arlovski played the role of a suspected terrorist hunted by the CIA. The show originally aired 3 November 2015.

Arlovski appeared on Mayhem Miller's MTV show Bully Beatdown, in which he beat the 'bully', thereby earning the 'victims' $10,000.

In 2018, Arlovski had a small role as a mob enforcer opposite Denzel Washington in the opening scene of The Equalizer 2.

Championships and accomplishments

Mixed Martial arts
 Ultimate Fighting Championship
 UFC Heavyweight Championship (One time; former)
 One successful title defense
 Interim UFC Heavyweight Championship (One time; first; former)
 One successful title defense
 Second most wins in UFC history (23) (Tied with Donald Cerrone)
 Second most fights in UFC history (39)
 Most wins in UFC heavyweight history (23)
 Most fights in UFC heavyweight history (39)
 Most total fight time in UFC heavyweight history (6:11:41)
 Highest takedown defense success in UFC heavyweight history (88.4%)
 Most decision bouts in UFC Heavyweight history (17)
 Most decision wins in UFC Heavyweight history (12)
 Most significant strikes landed in UFC heavyweight history (1336)
 Most strikes landed in UFC heavyweight history (1617)
 Fight of the Night (Two times) vs. Josh Barnett and Travis Browne
 Performance of the Night (One time)  vs. Antônio Silva
 First Belarusian champion in UFC history
 Combat Press
 2015 Comeback Fighter of the Year
 MMAJunkie.com
 2015 May Fight of the Month vs. Travis Browne
 Sherdog
 2015 Round of the Year vs. Travis Browne, round 1

Sambo
 European Youth Sambo
 European Youth Sambo Champion
 World Cup
 2nd place in the World Cup in Sambo
 World Sambo Championship
 2nd place at the World Sambo Championship

Mixed martial arts record

|-
|Loss
|align=center|34–21 (2)
|Marcos Rogério de Lima
|Submission (rear-naked choke)
|UFC Fight Night: Kattar vs. Allen
|
|align=center|1
|align=center|1:50
|Las Vegas, Nevada, United States
|
|-
|Win
|align=center|34–20 (2)
|Jake Collier
|Decision (split)
|UFC on ESPN: Font vs. Vera 
|
|align=center|3
|align=center|5:00
|Las Vegas, Nevada, United States
|
|-
|Win
|align=center|33–20 (2)
|Jared Vanderaa
|Decision (split)
|UFC 271
|
|align=center|3
|align=center|5:00
|Houston, Texas, United States
|
|-
|Win
|align=center|32–20 (2)
|Carlos Felipe
|Decision (unanimous)
|UFC Fight Night: Ladd vs. Dumont 
|
|align=center|3
|align=center|5:00
|Las Vegas, Nevada, United States
| 
|-
|Win
|align=center|31–20 (2)
|Chase Sherman
|Decision (unanimous)
|UFC on ESPN: Whittaker vs. Gastelum
|
|align=center|3
|align=center|5:00
|Las Vegas, Nevada, United States
|
|-
|Loss
|align=center|30–20 (2)
|Tom Aspinall
|Submission (rear-naked choke)
|UFC Fight Night: Blaydes vs. Lewis 
|
|align=center|2
|align=center|1:09
|Las Vegas, Nevada, United States
|
|-
|Win
|align=center|30–19 (2)
|Tanner Boser
|Decision (unanimous)
|UFC on ESPN: Santos vs. Teixeira
|
|align=center|3
|align=center|5:00
|Las Vegas, Nevada, United States
|
|-
|Win
|align=center| 29–19 (2)
|Philipe Lins
|Decision (unanimous)
|UFC Fight Night: Smith vs. Teixeira
|
|align=center|3
|align=center|5:00
|Jacksonville, Florida, United States
|
|-
|Loss
|align=center|28–19 (2)
|Jairzinho Rozenstruik
|KO (punch)
|UFC 244 
|
|align=center|1
|align=center|0:29
|New York City, New York, United States
|
|-
|Win
|align=center|28–18 (2)
|Ben Rothwell
|Decision (unanimous)
|UFC on ESPN: dos Anjos vs. Edwards 
|
|align=center|3
|align=center|5:00
|San Antonio, Texas, United States
|
|-
|Loss
|align=center|27–18 (2)
|Augusto Sakai
|Decision (split)
|UFC Fight Night: Jacaré vs. Hermansson 
|
|align=center|3
|align=center|5:00
|Sunrise, Florida, United States
|
|-
|NC
|align=center|27–17 (2)
|Walt Harris
|NC (overturned)
|UFC 232 
|
|align=center|3
|align=center|5:00
|Inglewood, California, United States
| 
|-
|Loss
|align=center|27–17 (1)
|Shamil Abdurakhimov
|Decision (unanimous)
|UFC Fight Night: Hunt vs. Oliynyk 
|
|align=center|3
|align=center|5:00
|Moscow, Russia
|
|-
|Loss
|align=center|27–16 (1)
|Tai Tuivasa
|Decision (unanimous)
|UFC 225 
|
|align=center|3
|align=center|5:00
|Chicago, Illinois, United States
|
|- 
|Win
|align=center|27–15 (1)
|Stefan Struve
|Decision (unanimous)
|UFC 222 
|
|align=center|3
|align=center|5:00
|Las Vegas, Nevada, United States
|
|-
|Win
|align=center|26–15 (1)
|Júnior Albini
|Decision (unanimous)
|UFC Fight Night: Poirier vs. Pettis
|
|align=center|3
|align=center|5:00
|Norfolk, Virginia, United States
|
|-
|Loss
|align=center|25–15 (1)
|Marcin Tybura
|Decision (unanimous)
|UFC Fight Night: Holm vs. Correia
|
|align=center|3
|align=center|5:00
|Kallang, Singapore
|
|-
|Loss
|style="text-align:center;"| 25–14 (1)
|Francis Ngannou
|TKO (punches)
|UFC on Fox: Shevchenko vs. Peña
|
|style="text-align:center;"|1
|style="text-align:center;"|1:32
|Denver, Colorado, United States
|
|-
|Loss
|style="text-align:center;"| 25–13 (1)
|Josh Barnett
|Submission (rear-naked choke)
|UFC Fight Night: Arlovski vs. Barnett
|
|style="text-align:center;"|3
|style="text-align:center;"|2:53
|Hamburg, Germany
|
|-
|Loss
|align=center| 25–12 (1)
|Alistair Overeem
|TKO (front kick and punches)
|UFC Fight Night: Overeem vs. Arlovski 
|
|align=center|2
|align=center|1:12
|Rotterdam, Netherlands
|
|-
|Loss
|align=center| 25–11 (1)
|Stipe Miocic
|TKO (punches)
|UFC 195 
|
|align=center|1
|align=center|0:54
|Las Vegas, Nevada, United States
|
|-
|Win
|align=center| 25–10 (1)
|Frank Mir
|Decision (unanimous)
|UFC 191
|
|align=center|3
|align=center|5:00
|Las Vegas, Nevada, United States
|
|-
|Win
|align=center| 24–10 (1)
|Travis Browne
|TKO (punches)
|UFC 187
|
|align=center|1
|align=center|4:41
|Las Vegas, Nevada, United States
|
|-
|  Win
| align=center| 23–10 (1)
| Antônio Silva
| KO (punches)
| UFC Fight Night: Bigfoot vs. Arlovski
| 
| align=center|1
| align=center|2:59
| Brasília, Brazil
| 
|-
|  Win
| align=center| 22–10 (1)
| Brendan Schaub
| Decision (split)
| UFC 174
| 
| align=center|3
| align=center|5:00
| Vancouver, British Columbia, Canada
|
|-
|  Win
| align=center| 21–10 (1)
| Andreas Kraniotakes
| TKO (punches)
| Fight Nights: Battle in Minsk
| 
| align=center| 2
| align=center| 3:14
| Minsk, Belarus
|
|-
|  Win
| align=center| 20–10 (1)
| Mike Kyle
| Decision (unanimous)
| WSOF 5
| 
| align=center| 3
| align=center| 5:00
| Atlantic City, New Jersey, United States
|
|-
|  Loss
| align=center| 19–10 (1)
| Anthony Johnson
| Decision (unanimous)
| WSOF 2
| 
| align=center| 3
| align=center| 5:00
| Atlantic City, New Jersey, United States
|
|-
|  Win
| align=center| 19–9 (1)
| Mike Hayes
| Decision (unanimous)
| Fight Nights: Battle of Moscow 9
| 
| align=center| 3
| align=center| 5:00
| Moscow, Russia
|
|-
|  Win
| align=center| 18–9 (1)
| Devin Cole
| TKO (punches)
| WSOF 1
| 
| align=center| 1
| align=center| 2:37
| Las Vegas, Nevada, United States
|
|-
|  NC
| align=center| 17–9 (1)
| Tim Sylvia
| NC (illegal soccer kicks)
| ONE FC 5: Pride of a Nation
| 
| align=center| 2
| align=center| 4:46
| Quezon City, Philippines
|
|-
|  Win
| align=center| 17–9
| Travis Fulton
| KO (head kick)
| ProElite 2: Big Guns
| 
| align=center| 3
| align=center| 4:59
| Moline, Illinois, United States
|
|-
|  Win
| align=center| 16–9
| Ray Lopez
| TKO (punches)
| ProElite: Arlovski vs. Lopez
| 
| align=center| 3
| align=center| 2:43
| Honolulu, Hawaii, United States
|
|-
|  Loss
| align=center| 15–9
| Sergei Kharitonov
| KO (punches)
| Strikeforce: Fedor vs. Silva
| 
| align=center| 1
| align=center| 2:49
| East Rutherford, New Jersey, United States
|
|-
|  Loss
| align=center| 15–8
| Antônio Silva
| Decision (unanimous)
| Strikeforce: Heavy Artillery
| 
| align=center| 3
| align=center| 5:00
| St. Louis, Missouri, United States
|
|-
| Loss
| align=center| 15–7
| Brett Rogers
| TKO (punches)
| Strikeforce: Lawler vs. Shields
| 
| align=center| 1
| align=center| 0:22
| St. Louis, Missouri, United States
| 
|-
| Loss
| align=center| 15–6
| Fedor Emelianenko
| KO (punch)
| Affliction: Day of Reckoning
| 
| align=center| 1
| align=center| 3:14
| Anaheim, California, United States
| 
|-
| Win
| align=center| 15–5
| Roy Nelson
| KO (punch)
| EliteXC: Heat
| 
| align=center| 2
| align=center| 1:46
| Sunrise, Florida, United States
| 
|-
| Win
| align=center| 14–5
| Ben Rothwell
| KO (punches)
| Affliction: Banned
| 
| align=center| 3
| align=center| 1:13
| Anaheim, California, United States
| 
|-
| Win
| align=center| 13–5
| Jake O'Brien
| TKO (punches)
| UFC 82
| 
| align=center| 2
| align=center| 4:17
| Columbus, Ohio, United States
| 
|-
| Win
| align=center| 12–5
| Fabrício Werdum
| Decision (unanimous)
| UFC 70
| 
| align=center| 3
| align=center| 5:00
| Manchester, England
| 
|-
| Win
| align=center| 11–5
| Márcio Cruz
| KO (punches)
| UFC 66
| 
| align=center| 1
| align=center| 3:15
| Las Vegas, Nevada, United States
| 
|-
| Loss
| align=center| 10–5
| Tim Sylvia
| Decision (unanimous)
| UFC 61
| 
| align=center| 5
| align=center| 5:00
| Las Vegas, Nevada, United States
| 
|-
| Loss
| align=center| 10–4
| Tim Sylvia
| TKO (punches)
| UFC 59
| 
| align=center| 1
| align=center| 2:43
| Anaheim, California, United States
| 
|-
| Win
| align=center|10–3
| Paul Buentello
| KO (punch)
| UFC 55
| 
| align=center| 1
| align=center| 0:15
| Uncasville, Connecticut, United States
| 
|-
| Win
| align=center| 9–3
| Justin Eilers
| TKO (punches)
| UFC 53
| 
| align=center| 1
| align=center| 4:10
| Atlantic City, New Jersey, United States
| 
|-
| Win
| align=center|8–3
| Tim Sylvia
| Submission (achilles lock)
| UFC 51
| 
| align=center| 1
| align=center| 0:47
| Las Vegas, Nevada, United States
| 
|-
| Win
| align=center| 7–3
| Wesley Correira
| TKO (punches)
| UFC 47
| 
| align=center| 2
| align=center| 1:15
| Las Vegas, Nevada, United States
| 
|-
| Win
| align=center| 6–3
| Vladimir Matyushenko
| KO (punch)
| UFC 44
| 
| align=center| 1
| align=center| 2:10
| Paradise, Nevada, United States
| 
|-
| Win
| align=center| 5–3
| Ian Freeman
| TKO (punches)
| UFC 40
| 
| align=center| 1
| align=center| 1:25
| Paradise, Nevada, United States
| 
|-
| Loss
| align=center| 4–3
| Pedro Rizzo
| KO (punches)
| UFC 36
| 
| align=center| 3
| align=center| 1:45
| Paradise, Nevada, United States
| 
|-
| Loss
| align=center| 4–2
| Ricco Rodriguez
| TKO (punches)
| UFC 32
| 
| align=center| 3
| align=center| 1:23
| East Rutherford, New Jersey, United States
| 
|-
| Win
| align=center|4–1
| Aaron Brink
| Submission (armbar)
| UFC 28
| 
| align=center| 1
| align=center| 0:55
| Atlantic City, New Jersey, United States
| 
|-
| Win
| align=center| 3–1
| John Dixson
| KO (punches)
| Super Fight
| 
| align=center| 1
| align=center| 0:13
| Saint Petersburg, Russia
| 
|-
| Win
| align=center| 2–1
| Roman Zentsov
| TKO (punches)
| M-1 MFC: European Championship 2000
| 
| align=center| 1
| align=center| 1:18
| Saint Petersburg, Russia
|
|-
| Win
| align=center| 1–1
| Michael Tielrooy
| Submission (guillotine choke)
| M-1 MFC: European Championship 2000
| 
| align=center| 1
| align=center| 1:25
| Saint Petersburg, Russia
| 
|-
| Loss
| align=center| 0–1
| Viacheslav Datsik
| KO (punch)
| M-1 MFC: World Championship 1999
| 
| align=center| 1
| align=center| 6:05
| Saint Petersburg, Russia
|

Pay-Per-View Bouts

See also
 List of current UFC fighters
 List of male mixed martial artists

References

External links
 
 

|-

1979 births
Living people
Belarusian male mixed martial artists
Heavyweight mixed martial artists
Belarusian sambo practitioners
Ultimate Fighting Championship champions
Sportspeople from Minsk
Belarusian expatriate sportspeople in the United States
Ultimate Fighting Championship male fighters
Mixed martial artists utilizing sambo
Mixed martial artists utilizing boxing